Thomas Ott (born 10 June 1966) is a Swiss comic artist. His comics have been published in German-speaking countries, France, the United States, Spain, Denmark, Italy and other places.

Ott's often wordless comics feature a dark, grim atmosphere; he works mainly with cutters and scratchboard.

Biography 
After graduating from the School of Design in Zurich in 1987, Ott worked as a comic artist in Zurich and Paris. His first book, Tales of Error, was published by Edition Moderne in 1989. Other books followed with the same publisher as well as the French publisher L'Association. He has worked for Strapazin, Lapin, L'Écho des Savanes and various newspapers, among other publications.

From 1998 to June 2001, Ott studied film at the Zurich School of Art and Design. His diploma film was the 15-minute Sjeki vatcsh!!.

In 2013, Ott released another new work after three years: Dark Country is the story of a nightmarish honeymoon and is a standalone adaptation of the 2008 film of the same name by screenwriter Tab Murphy and director and Hollywood actor Thomas Jane (The Punisher). Jane himself invited Ott to tell his film as a comic.

Works 

 Tales of Error, 1989, Edition Moderne
 Phantom der Superheld, 1994, Edition Moderne
 Greetings from Hellville, 1995, Edition Moderne
 Dead End, 1996, Edition Moderne
 La douane, 1996, L’Association
 La bête à cinq doigts, 1996, L'Association
 La grande famiglia, 1997, L'Association
 t.o.t.t., 2002, Edition Moderne
 Cinema Panopticum, 2005, Edition Moderne
 The Number 73304-23-4153-6-96-8, Zürich: Edition Moderne 2008, 2nd edition 2013. ISBN 978-3-03731-025-0
 Unplugged. Das Skizzenbuch, Zürich: Edition Stephan Witschi, 2009
 R.I.P. Best of 1985-2004, Zürich: Edition Moderne 2010. ISBN 3037310529
 Dark Country, Zürich: Edition Moderne 2013. ISBN 978-3-03731-114-1
 Black Island, Zürich: Hammer-Verlag 2013
 A Hell of a Woman (Jim Thompson), Editions la Baconnière, 2014
 Louis Vuitton - Travel Book - Route 66, Editions Louis Vuitton, 2017
 Wo die Liebe hinfällt (illustrations by Thomas Ott), Diogenes Verlag, 2018
 The Forest, translated from La Forêt, published in France, 2020
 Der Wald. Carlsen, Hamburg, 2021, ISBN 978-3-551-76020-3

Awards 

 1996: Max & Moritz Prize at the Comic-Salon Erlangen for Best German-speaking comic artist
 2017: Swiss Federal Office of Culture Grand Award for Design.

Weblinks 

 Official Website

References 

1966 births
Swiss comics artists
Artists from Zürich
Living people